Phaeoscypha is a genus of fungi within the Hyaloscyphaceae family. The genus contains xx species.

References

External links 

 Phaeoscypha at Index Fungorum

Hyaloscyphaceae